Escape is an American anthology series that aired on the NBC network from February 11 to April 1, 1973. The show was a production of Jack Webb's Mark VII Limited for Universal Television. It aired on Sunday evenings at 10 p.m. Eastern, following the NBC Mystery Movie.

Synopsis
Webb, best known for portraying Joe Friday on the long-running Dragnet, narrated this half-hour anthology series about people who found themselves in dangerous situations and who had to muster enough ingenuity and rely upon luck to save themselves from otherwise certain death. Like several of the other shows Webb packaged through the years, the format was that of a semi-documentary, with the narration punctuating the scenes.

Intended as a trial run for a permanent slot during the 1973–74 season, the show did not do well in the ratings and ended after only four episodes. Reruns were broadcast that summer.

Episodes

References

Sources

External links
 
Escape at CVTA with episode list

1973 American television series debuts
1973 American television series endings
1970s American drama television series
1970s American anthology television series
English-language television shows
NBC original programming
Television series by Mark VII Limited
Television series by Universal Television